Rui Manuel Pinto de Lima (born 25 March 1978) is a Portuguese former professional footballer who played as a left midfielder.

Club career
Lima was born in Porto. During his early and mid-career, he played for hometown club Boavista F.C. on two separate occasions, also representing Gondomar SC, C.D. Aves (twice), G.D. Chaves, Vitória de Setúbal and S.C. Beira-Mar, experiencing his most solid period whilst at the latter with three Primeira Liga seasons in four years.

In summer 2007, Lima started an abroad adventure, joining Cypriot First Division side AC Omonia. However, he would finish the campaign with another team in the country, Nea Salamis Famagusta FC, returning to Boavista in 2008 with the club recently relegated to the second division.

After Boavista dropped another level in 2008–09, Lima returned to Cyprus, linking up with another former club, Nea Salamina. In late January 2010, however, he changed teams – and countries – again, signing with Hapoel Haifa F.C. in Israel.

References

External links

1978 births
Living people
Footballers from Porto
Portuguese footballers
Association football midfielders
Primeira Liga players
Liga Portugal 2 players
Segunda Divisão players
Campeonato de Portugal (league) players
Gondomar S.C. players
C.D. Aves players
G.D. Chaves players
Boavista F.C. players
Vitória F.C. players
S.C. Beira-Mar players
U.D. Oliveirense players
S.C. Salgueiros players
F.C. Pedras Rubras players
Cypriot First Division players
AC Omonia players
Nea Salamis Famagusta FC players
Israeli Premier League players
Hapoel Haifa F.C. players
Portugal youth international footballers
Portugal B international footballers
Portuguese expatriate footballers
Expatriate footballers in Cyprus
Expatriate footballers in Israel
Portuguese expatriate sportspeople in Cyprus
Portuguese expatriate sportspeople in Israel